Bonnie Leigh McKee (born January 20, 1984) is an American singer and songwriter. Her debut album, Trouble, was released in 2004 by Reprise Records. After underperforming McKee was dropped by her label and took a musical hiatus before establishing herself as a songwriter. She has written 10 singles that have reached number one in either the United States or the United Kingdom, which have sold more than 30 million copies worldwide combined. In 2013, McKee made a return to music with many singles, including "American Girl". She independently released an EP, Bombastic (2015).

McKee is particularly known for collaborating with pop singer Katy Perry. The duo wrote the hits "California Gurls", "Teenage Dream", "Last Friday Night (T.G.I.F.)", "Part of Me", "Wide Awake", and "Roar". McKee also co-wrote "Dynamite" by Taio Cruz, which became the second-best selling song by a British artist in the digital era. McKee co-wrote other hits including "Hold It Against Me" by Britney Spears and "C'Mon" by Kesha; she has written for Cher, Christina Aguilera, Kelly Clarkson, and Adam Lambert. McKee also has collaborated with Canadian acapella singer Mike Tompkins.

Early life

Childhood
McKee was born in Vacaville, California, and raised in Seattle. She studied classical piano and became a member of the Seattle Girls Choir Prime Voci at age 12; she toured with the choir throughout North America and Europe. She recorded two albums with the choir, titled Jackson Berkey Meets The Seattle Girls' Choir and Cantate 2000. She briefly attended the Bush School where she recorded a demonstration piece as part of a class project; she was kicked out soon afterwards. At age 12, McKee's mother gave a demonstration CD featuring her singing Bette Midler and Fiona Apple songs to a friend of hers who is the co-founder of the Sub Pop label, Jonathan Poneman. Poneman was intrigued by her songwriting talents. According to McKee, this was the moment when she realized she had to be "more than just a singer." She knew she had to be a songwriter as well.

Career

2004–2005: Career beginnings and Trouble

McKee was wrote songs and performed in the Seattle area when she was 15. Her demo tape which was raw got to Colin Filkow, an ex-Priority Records label executive. Filkow recognized that she was a rare talent and signed her to his management company, Platinum Partners Artist Management in Beverly Hills. He flew her to Los Angeles and welcomed her into his family; she was only 17 at the time. He inspired her to sing and write songs and to trust her instincts. Filkow took Bonnie's demo to dozens of labels, publishers, agents, and entertainment lawyers. After more than a year, Filkow signed Bonnie to Warner Brothers Records in one of the most lucrative signings ever for a new artist.

Her debut album Trouble was recorded across a period of two years by producers Bob Power and Rob Cavallo, and commercially released on September 28, 2004. Reprise was unsure on how to sell McKee, so the label settled a partnership with internet radio website LAUNCHcast, which would promote the lead single "Somebody". "Somebody" soon became one of the most played tracks on the website, and its popularity with young females led to a strategy where McKee would be a subversive alternative to the teen pop demographic. "Somebody" was performed on Jimmy Kimmel Live!, included in the motion picture Win a Date with Tad Hamilton!, and had a music video featured on MTV's Buzzworthy and VH1's You Oughta Know. Trouble received positive reviews in Blender, Nylon, The Los Angeles Times, and Teen People, but was commercially unsuccessful. McKee spoke about the album being unsuccessful, saying, "It was devastating when the album didn't happen," she said. "I realized there are so many steps from getting a deal to having a hit... and I didn't get there. It was a huge letdown." McKee began work on a second studio album which never came to existence. According to McKee, she "downward-spiraled" and began to abuse crystal meth, an addiction with which she struggled for several years. She was dropped from the label after defacing the CEO's car with lipstick during the middle of the night.

2006–2013: Songwriting and Epic records releases

Following her release from Reprise Records, McKee managed to get a job at Pulse Recordings' publishing arm, Check Your Pulse, through her boyfriend and longtime collaborator, Oliver "Oligee" Goldstein. She lived in poverty, without hot water, a cell phone, or a car while spending many hours in the recording studio, learning how to use Pro Tools and crafting new songs alongside Elliott Yamin and Leighton Meester. In 2009, McKee was introduced to music producer Dr. Luke by her manager Josh Abraham. Dr. Luke had collaborated with McKee's longtime friend Katy Perry on her second album One of the Boys. About this time, Perry expressed interest in having "a co-writer I could volley with", adding that "Bonnie and I are on the same zeitgeist tip."

Perry and McKee (along with Max Martin and Benny Blanco) began writing songs, eventually producing the hits that would appear on Perry's third album, Teenage Dream. McKee co-wrote three singles from the album, "California Gurls", "Teenage Dream", and "Last Friday Night (T.G.I.F.)", the last of which was inspired by McKee and Perry's misadventures in their teenage years. Each of the singles topped the Billboard Hot 100 chart, and they earned McKee several BMI Pop Awards in 2011 and 2012 for her role as a songwriter. McKee also co-wrote two more chart-toppers for Perry, "Part of Me" and "Roar" as well as four other songs which hit number one on either the Hot 100 or the UK Singles Chart, Britney Spears' "Hold It Against Me", Taio Cruz's "Dynamite", Rita Ora's "How We Do (Party)", and Cheryl's "I Don't Care". On June 22, 2017, the Recording Industry Association of America (RIAA) announced that "Roar" had received an RIAA Diamond certification award for 10 million copies sold.

In 2012, McKee co-wrote two songs that appeared on Adam Lambert's album Trespassing, which debuted at number one on the Billboard 200 Album Chart. She appeared as a featured performer on "Thunder" from Rusko's album Songs, released on Mad Decent. During this time she signed a recording contract with Epic Records. She had garnered attention for her fashion sense, appearing on E!'s Fashion Police, and appearing on the pages of The New York Times, New York Post, and Schön! Magazine. In 2013, McKee was awarded with three more BMI Pop awards for her songwriting work on Katy Perry's "Wide Awake" and "Part of Me", as well as Britney Spears' "Hold It Against Me".

McKee's first single under Epic Records was "American Girl", which was released on July 23, 2013. She posted a promotional video for "American Girl" on YouTube in June 2013 which garnered 2.3 million views. The official music video for the song was released on July 22, 2013. In October, McKee released a new song titled "Sleepwalker". McKee confirmed that the song was not a single, but rather an "inbetweengle", a portmanteau meaning "in between single", meant to tide fans over until her next official release. The music video premiered on October 17, 2013, and starred McKee and Kelsey Chow. McKee had spent several years under a joint deal between Epic and Kemosabe Records, and had planned to release her second studio album in the summer of 2014. A second single titled "S.L.A.Y." was performed at multiple venues and while she was on tour with Karmin on their Pulses Tour, but was delayed many times and eventually not released. McKee left Epic and Kemosabe Records after feeling she had a lack of control over her career and the creative direction that she wanted to take.

2014–present: Independent career, standalone singles and Bombastic

On December 18, 2014, McKee released a song called "California Winter" on to her SoundCloud and iTunes. On April 12, 2015, in an interview with Ultimate Music, she announced she had departed from Epic Records. McKee stated that this was because she favors her being an independent artist because she felt controlled and like she had no creative freedom. She said that she is releasing her second extended play in June. She also stated her intentions for it to be a visual EP. One song titled "Wasted Youth" has been announced and has already had its music video filmed. At the Billboard Music Awards 2015, McKee revealed in an interview that Charlie Puth, with whom she had previously worked on her song "California Winter", had co-written her next single, which she also said would be released in the next week. This single is believed to be called "Bombastic" as teased on her Instagram page. The video for "Bombastic" released onto Bonnie's VEVO account on May 26, 2015. McKee is set to appear in Eden xo's music video for her single "The Weekend". McKee plays "Cinderella". The "Bombastic" EP was released on June 30, being her first album release since her 2004 debut Trouble. 

On July 1, McKee announced on a live stream she was trying to get back the rights to the songs she had previously recorded with her former label Epic Records, so she could finally get to release them; she also confirmed physical copies of the "Bombastic" EP were being released in the coming months. For Christmas, McKee released a special called "California Winter Extravaganza" on her YouTube account on December 16, which features Ferras, Sarah Hudson, Lindsey Stirling, Todrick Hall, Karmin, Eden xo, Paper Pilots, and Bridget Marquardt.

On January 12, 2016, McKee released the music video for "Wasted Youth" on her VEVO channel. She uploaded a cover of Prince's song, "When Doves Cry" on her YouTube channel on April 28, 2016, as a tribute to Prince following his death on April 21, 2016. Of the cover, she said, "Prince has been and always will be one of my favorite artists and songwriters of all time. I'm not exaggerating when I say that I ask myself nearly every time I sit down to write a song, "What would Prince do?" "Doves Cry" is perfection and I know I could never even hope to touch his brilliance, but in his passing, I realized how much this song really means to me, and was inspired to pay homage to the late, great, genius who taught me to take musical risks, to act my age and not my shoe size, and how to get through this thing called life". On June 21, 2016, McKee released "I Want It All" as the third single from the EP and published the music video on her VEVO account.
In September 2016, in collaboration with Quest Nutrition brand, McKee released the video for the song "Stud Muffin" inspired by the movie Grease. On November 2, 2016, McKee released "Easy" as the fourth and final single from the EP and published the music video on her VEVO account. In December 16, 2016 McKee released her single called "Stars In Your Heart", alongside the shelved music video from 2013, as a gift for her fans.

On August 18, 2017, McKee released the single called "Thorns". She was featured on Norwegian DJ Kygo's track "Riding Shotgun" from his album Kids in Love, which was released on November 3, 2017.

In May 10, 2018, McKee released the single called "Mad Mad World", which premiered in Billboard Magazine. The song was released on streaming day later.

On February 15, McKee featured on Armin van Buuren single called "Lonely For You". She released a cover of Billie Eilish song called "Lovely", featuring AUGUST 08 on June 28, 2019. McKee released her collaboration with Eden xo called "Bad Girls Go To Heaven" on October 25, 2019.

In 2020, McKee directed and starred in her first short film, April Kills The Vibe.

Personal life 
McKee is bisexual, saying on an episode of In Bed with Joan, "I think it's one of those things where, you know, I think all little girls kind of play 'doctor' with their girlfriends, and then I kind of never grew out of it."

Influences
McKee has cited Mariah Carey, Madonna, Tina Turner, Blondie, Michael Jackson, Whitney Houston, and Prince as major influences of hers while she was growing up.

Discography

Studio albums
Trouble (2004)

Extended plays
Bonnie McKee (2003)
Bombastic (2015)

Tours
Opening act
Ryan Cabrera (2005)
 Jonas Brothers Live (The Jonas Brothers) (2013)
 Pulses Tour (Karmin) (2014)
 Kids in Love Tour (Kygo) (2017–18)

Filmography

Film

Television

Web series

See also 
List of songs written by Bonnie McKee

References

External links 

 
21st-century American singers
American women pop singers
American women singer-songwriters
American synth-pop musicians
Bisexual actresses
Bisexual singers
Bisexual songwriters
Epic Records artists
LGBT people from California
LGBT people from Washington (state)
American LGBT singers
American LGBT songwriters
Living people
Musicians from Seattle
Musicians from the San Francisco Bay Area
People from Vacaville, California
Reprise Records artists
Singer-songwriters from California
21st-century American women singers
American women in electronic music
20th-century LGBT people
21st-century LGBT people
Singer-songwriters from Washington (state)
American bisexual actors
1984 births